Gollapudi is a commercial and residential hub located in western part of Vijayawada in the Indian state of Andhra Pradesh. It falls under Vijayawada Rural mandal in Vijayawada revenue division of NTR district. As per the G. O. No. M. S. 104 (Dated: 23-03-2017), Municipal Administration and Urban Development Department, it is a part of Vijayawada Metropolitan Area.

Transport

References 

Neighbourhoods in Vijayawada